Lucy Katherine Partington (4 March 1952 – some time between 27 December 1973 and 2 January 1974; aged 21) was a British murder victim. She was born in St Albans, the third child of Roger and Margaret (Bardwell) Partington. On the night of 27 December 1973, during her final year of reading English Literature at Exeter University, she was abducted by serial killers Fred and Rosemary West while waiting at the Pitville Pump Room bus stop on Evesham Road, Cheltenham, for the 10.30pm Marchants Bus service via Bishops Cleeve to Gretton, where her parents lived. The Wests had first met while waiting to use the same bus route, from Cheltenham to Bishops Cleeve, four years earlier.

Discovery of body and aftermath
Partington's exact date of death will never be known. However, at twenty-five past midnight on 3 January 1974, Fred West admitted himself into the casualty unit at Gloucester Royal hospital with a serious laceration of his right-hand that required several stitches, leading to speculation that she was finally killed on 2 January 1974 and that she had been kept alive and tortured for several days in the cellar of the Wests' home in Cromwell Street before finally being murdered. Her remains were discovered there at 9am on 6 March 1994 alongside the knife West used to dismember them. Seventy two of her bones were missing.

On 16 February 1995, Partington's remains were reburied in Exeter, Devon.

Partington's sister, Marian Partington, wrote about the impact of Lucy's life, disappearance, and death in her memoir, If You Sit Very Still, in May 2012. The book builds on Salvaging the Sacred, an essay written by Marian and published in The Guardian Weekend in May 1996. The essay inspired a play by Bryony Lavery (Frozen), which premiered in 1998, and a feature film by Juliet McKoen, also entitled Frozen (2005).

Lucy Partington was the cousin of novelist Martin Amis. He dedicated his novel The Information to her memory and writes about her life and death in his memoir Experience.

See also
List of solved missing person cases

References

Further reading 
 
 

1952 births
1970s missing person cases
1973 deaths
Amis family
English murder victims
Female murder victims
Formerly missing people
Missing person cases in England
Murdered students
People from St Albans
People murdered in England
Victims of serial killers
Violence against women in England